George Thomas Pierce (January 10, 1888 – October 11, 1935) was a Major League Baseball pitcher.

External links

1888 births
1935 deaths
Major League Baseball pitchers
Chicago Cubs players
St. Louis Cardinals players
Baseball players from Illinois
Lansing Senators players
Augusta Tourists players
Buffalo Bisons (minor league) players
Providence Grays (minor league) players
Scranton Miners players
Toledo Iron Men players
Kansas City Blues (baseball) players
People from DeKalb County, Illinois